Maxime François Émile Destremau or Destremeau  was a French Naval Lieutenant who served in World War I and was notable for his service during the Bombardment of Papeete.

Biography
Destremau was born in Algiers as the son of Arthur Destremau who was a member of chief of staff  and Marie Dromard.

He was a student of the Collège Stanislas de Paris from 1885 to 1889, he entered the École navale in 1892 and graduated in the ninth class. He was first assigned to the advisory-transporter Scorff (1896) and later to the cruiser Éclaireur (1897) and finally to the Eure transport aviso (1899). In 1902 he passed through the torpedo officer school, at the exit from which he was appointed second of the autonomous submersible torpedo boat Narval. He was promoted to lieutenant on 13 July 1904, and to 1st lieutenant in August 1905 and commanded the submarine Gustave-Zédé. Then on 25 September 1907 he commanded the submersible autonomous torpedo boat Pluviôse. He was then an Officer-student of the École supérieure de la Marine in 1911 until December 1913, he took command of the gunboat Zélée, within the Oceania naval division.

In Tahiti, or known in Tahitian as "tōmānā ʻāpī" or "new commander", came into conflict at the very beginning of the First World War, with the governor William Fawtier who defended the interests of traders and refrains from arresting or expelling German or Austrian nationalists, even after having received official communication of the declaration of war. Destremau nonetheless organized the defense of the island, by landing most of the artillery of the Zélée to reinforce the coastal defenses and by training the small troop that were eligible for conscription in order to resist a possible German landing.

Bombardment of Papeete

Thanks to these provisions, Destremau succeeds on keeping the armored cruisers Scharnhorst and Gneisenau at a distance when they presented themselves in front of Papeete, and to prevent the Germans from seizing their coal stock on 22 September 1914. Having in accordance with commands, received in the event of an attack by disproportionate force sacrificed the Zélée in battle. In February 1915. he was commander of destroyer Boutefeu. But he fell seriously ill and died in Toulon, on 7 March, from uremia, and wouldn't receive any honors until years later.

At his posthumous citation to the Order of the Army, in December 1915, "Lieutenant Destremau (Maxime-François-Émile), commanding the gunboat La Zélée and the troops at Papeete: knew, on the day of 22 September 1914, take the most judicious measures to ensure the defense of the port of Papeete against the attack of the German cruisers Sharnorst and Gneiseneau. Has shown in the conduct of defense operations the greatest personal bravery and military qualities of the first order which have resulted in preserving the port of Papeete and causing the removal of enemy cruisers ", Admiral de Bon proposed in 1919 to add the attribution of the officer's rosette of the Legion of Honor with the following quote: "Lieutenant Destremau, commanding the defense of Tahiti, after the disarmament of the Zelée , was able, in spite of the little help from the local authorities, to organize the defense of the island, so as to prevent the Scharnhorst and the Gneisenau from seize it ” . This final double proposal was not followed up.

He was buried in the cemetery of Amblans-et-Velotte, Haute-Saône, France.

Family
Maxime's older brother, became general at the end of the First World War. Maxime Destremau left behind six children, one of whom, Pierre, would become a captain of the vessel. The skipper Sébastien Destremau is the great-grandson of Maxime Destremau.

Honors and awards
Knight of the Legion of Honor
An avenue in Papeete bears his name.

References

Bibliography
Destremau, un destin polynesien, by Catherine Marconnet ( prod. ) And Pascale Berlin-Salmon ( dir. ), Screenplay by Pascale Berlin-Salmon, coll. "Archipels", August 2014, 50  min  42  s Online Presentation

History of the Assembly of French Polynesia, “DESTREMAU (Maxime) (1875-1915) ”  archive

1875 births
1915 deaths
French military personnel of World War I
People from Algiers
French Navy officers
École Navale alumni
Deaths from kidney disease
French people in French Algeria